The 1995–96 UEFA Cup was the 25th season of Europe's then-tertiary club football tournament organised by UEFA. It was won by German club Bayern Munich on aggregate over Bordeaux of France. Girondins de Bordeaux went to the finals all the way from the 1995 UEFA Intertoto Cup, its first season, being the only Intertoto Cup entrant to reach this far of the UEFA Cup. With this victory, Bayern became the third club to have won all three major European trophies (European Cup/UEFA Champions League, UEFA Cup/UEFA Europa League, and the Cup Winners' Cup). The finals itself was the only UEFA Cup final during the 1990s to not feature any Italian sides.

The 1995–96 season also saw the return of Yugoslav clubs on the international scene after three years of ban due to UN embargo. However, Yugoslav national champion, Red Star Belgrade, was eliminated as early as in the qualifying round.

Format
According to 1994 UEFA ranking, the Netherlands and Hungary lost a slot, while Israel gained one. Under a UEFA special decision, Czech Republic and Slovakia were still considered as a single country.

The access list was finally increased to 96 clubs:
 the federations with a UEFA place rose from the traditional number of 32 to 36,
 the national champions excluded from the Champions League were 23,
 two winners of the new UEFA Intertoto Cup entered into the UEFA Cup,
 3 clubs of the UEFA Fair Play ranking were added.

Teams
The labels in the parentheses show how each team qualified for the place of its starting round:
 TH: Title holders
 LC: League Cup winners
 Nth: League position
 IC: Intertoto Cup
 FP: Fair play

Preliminary round

|}

First leg

Second leg

Omonia won 5–1 on aggregate.

Sparta Prague won 4–2 on aggregate.

RAF Jelgava won 2–1 on aggregate.

Olimpija Ljubljana won 3–2 on aggregate.

Widzew Łódź won 5–0 on aggregate.

Brøndby won 6–0 on aggregate.

Silkeborg won 6–1 on aggregate.

Levski Sofia won 2–1 on aggregate.

Malmö won 4–0 on aggregate.

Lugano won 4-0 on aggregate.

Újpest won 3–1 on aggregate.

0–0 on aggregate; Dinamo Minsk won 3–1 on penalties.

Fenerbahçe won 6–0 on aggregate.

Vardar won 3–0 on aggregate.

Glenavon won 1–0 on aggregate.

Chornomorets Odessa won 7–2 on aggregate.

Austria Wien won 9–1 on aggregate.

Lillestrøm won 4–1 on aggregate.

3–3 on aggregate; MyPa won on away goals.

Örebro fielded an ineligible player, so the match was awarded 3–0 to Avenir Beggen. Avenir Beggen won 3–0 on aggregate.

Botev Plovdiv won 2–0 on aggregate.

Olympiacos won 3–0 on aggregate.

Raith Rovers won 6–2 on aggregate.

Neuchâtel Xamax won 1–0 on aggregate.

IA won 6–0 on aggregate.

Slovan Bratislava won 6–0 on aggregate.

Slavia Prague won 2–1 on aggregate.

Hapoel Be'er Sheva won 3–0 on aggregate.

Maribor won 2–1 on aggregate.

Viking won 7–1 on aggregate.

Zagłębie Lubin won 1–0 on aggregate.

Zimbru Chișinău won 2–0 on aggregate.

First round

|}

First leg

Second leg

Lugano won 2–1 on aggregate.

Milan won 8–1 on aggregate.

2–2 on aggregate; Sparta Prague won on away goals.

Leeds United won 3–1 on aggregate.

Bayern Munich won 5–1 on aggregate.

Brøndby won 3–0 on aggregate.

1–1 on aggregate; Chornomorets Odessa won 6–5 on penalties.

Liverpool won 2–1 on aggregate.

Real Betis won 4–1 on aggregate.

Dinamo Minsk won 3–1 on aggregate.

Bordeaux won 3–1 on aggregate.

Werder Bremen won 7–0 on aggregate.

Barcelona won 12–0 on aggregate.

Benfica won 5–2 on aggregate.

2–2 on aggregate; Nottingham Forest won on away goals.

PSV won 8–2 on aggregate.

Roma won 5–1 on aggregate.

Olympiacos won 5–1 on aggregate.

Eendracht Aalst won 3–1 on aggregate.

Raith Rovers won 3–2 on aggregate.

Lens won 13–0 on aggregate.

Strasbourg won 5–0 on aggregate.

Roda JC won 5–2 on aggregate.

Lyon won 2–0 on aggregate.

Slavia Prague won 2–1 on aggregate.

2–2 on aggregate; Rotor Volgograd won on away goals.

Sevilla won 3–1 on aggregate.

Kaiserslautern won 4–2 on aggregate.

Lazio won 7–1 on aggregate.

Auxerre won 2–1 on aggregate.

Vitória de Guimarães won 3–1 on aggregate.

Zimbru Chișinău won 3–1 on aggregate.

Second round

|}

First leg

Second leg

Real Betis won 4–1 on aggregate.

Slavia Prague won 3–1 on aggregate.

Sparta Prague won 6–3 on aggregate.

Nottingham Forest won 1–0 on aggregate.

Roma won 4–0 on aggregate.

Brøndby won 1–0 on aggregate.

Barcelona won 7–0 on aggregate.

Lens won 4–0 on aggregate.

Bordeaux won 3–1 on aggregate.

PSV won 8–3 on aggregate.

Lyon won 4–1 on aggregate.

Bayern Munich won 4–1 on aggregate.

Milan won 3–1 on aggregate.

2–2 on aggregate; Sevilla won on away goals.

Benfica won 3–2 on aggregate.

Werder Bremen won 6–2 on aggregate.

Third round

|}

First leg

Second leg

Milan won 2–0 on aggregate.

Bayern Munich won 7–2 on aggregate.

Roma won 4–3 on aggregate.

Bordeaux won 3–2 on aggregate.

Nottingham Forest won 1–0 on aggregate.

PSV won 2–1 on aggregate.

Barcelona won 4–2 on aggregate.

Slavia Prague won 1–0 on aggregate.

Quarter-finals

|}

First leg

Second leg
 
Bordeaux won 3–2 on aggregate.

Barcelona won 5–4 on aggregate.

3–3 on aggregate; Slavia Prague won on away goals.

Bayern Munich won 7–2 on aggregate.

Semi-finals

|}

First leg

Second leg

Bordeaux won 2–0 on aggregate.

Bayern Munich won 4–3 on aggregate.

Final

First leg

Second leg

Bayern Munich won 5–1 on aggregate.

Top scorers
The top scorers from the 1995–96 UEFA Cup are as follows:

See also
1995–96 UEFA Champions League
1995–96 UEFA Cup Winners' Cup
1995 UEFA Intertoto Cup

References

External links
1995–96 All matches UEFA Cup – season at UEFA website
Official Site
Results at RSSSF.com
 All scorers 1995–96 UEFA Cup according to (excluding preliminary round) according to protocols UEFA + all scorers preliminary round
1995/96 UEFA Cup – results and line-ups (archive)

 
UEFA Cup seasons
2